Patrick Bick (born 12 March 1977 in Illingen) is a former German football player who last played for SSV Markranstädt.

Career 
He made his debut on the professional league level in the 2. Bundesliga for Eintracht Braunschweig on 14 August 2005 when he came on as a substitute for Benjamin Siegert in the 51st minute in a game against LR Ahlen.

Post-retirement 

After retiring as a player in 2013, Bick joined Eintracht Braunschweig's staff as the club's chief physiotherapist.

References

1977 births
Living people
People from Neunkirchen (German district)
Footballers from Saarland
German footballers
1. FC Saarbrücken players
FC 08 Homburg players
SV Elversberg players
FC Augsburg players
Eintracht Braunschweig players
SV Wehen Wiesbaden players
RB Leipzig players
2. Bundesliga players
Eintracht Braunschweig non-playing staff
Association football midfielders